Jia Zhijie (born 1935) is a retired politician of the People's Republic of China. He was born in Jilin Province. He graduated from the Moscow Petroleum Institute in 1960, the same year he joined the Chinese Communist Party (CCP). He served as governor of Gansu (1986–1993) and Hubei.

As governor of Gansu, he defended the state's first eugenics law passed in 1989. About 1.2 percent of Gansu's 22 million people were intellectually disabled, the highest rate in China. Jia Zhijie stated that, "Insane, dull-witted and idiotic people must first complete sterilization operations before they can register for marriage. Some people say this is inhumane, but we think just the opposite is true."

Political career

References 

1935 births
Living people
People's Republic of China politicians from Jilin
Chinese Communist Party politicians from Jilin
Governors of Gansu
Governors of Hubei
Political office-holders in Hubei